A mood ring is a type of ring created in 1975 that changes colors based upon the temperature of the finger of the wearer. 

Mood Ring may also refer to:

 "Mood Ring" (Britney Spears song), 2020
 "Mood Ring" (Lorde song), 2021
 Moodring, a 2003 album by Mýa
 "Mood Rings", a song by Relient K from the 2003 album Two Lefts Don't Make a Right...but Three Do